Kozhuun is the Tuvan term of an historical feudal administrative division known as a banner.  

The term kozhuun is used today as a unit in the system of the administrative divisions of the Tuva Republic of Russia.  A typical federal subject of Russia is subdivided into raions. Kozhuun is an ethnic name for a raion, used only in Tuva.

Tuva historically had nine kozhuun. Each kozhuun was divided into sums which was then subdivided into arbans.

List of historical kozhuuns 
Beezi
Daa-van and Choodu
Khaasuut
Khemchik
Nibazy
Oyunnar
Salchak
Shalyk
Tozhu

References 
Sources

Further reading

Types of administrative division
Districts of Tuva